Minunthozetes is a genus of mites belonging to the family Punctoribatidae.

The species of this genus are found in Europe and Western Asia.

Species:

Minunthozetes atomus 
Minunthozetes bicornis 
Minunthozetes hemectus 
Minunthozetes humectus 
Minunthozetes major 
Minunthozetes pseudofusiger 
Minunthozetes quadriareatus 
Minunthozetes semirufus 
Minunthozetes tarmani

References

Acari